Quantum finance is an interdisciplinary research field, applying theories and methods developed by quantum physicists and economists in order to solve problems in finance.  It is a branch of econophysics.

Background on instrument pricing 
Finance theory is heavily based on financial instrument pricing such as stock option pricing.  Many of the problems facing the finance community have no known analytical solution. As a result, numerical methods and computer simulations for solving these problems have proliferated.  This research area is known as computational finance.  Many computational finance problems have a high degree of computational complexity and are slow to converge to a solution on classical computers. In particular, when it comes to option pricing, there is additional complexity resulting from the need to respond to quickly changing markets. For example, in order to take advantage of inaccurately priced stock options, the computation must complete before the next change in the almost continuously changing stock market. As a result, the finance community is always looking for ways to overcome the resulting performance issues that arise when pricing options. This has led to research that applies alternative computing techniques to finance.

Background on quantum finance 
One of these alternatives is quantum computing. Just as physics models have evolved from classical to quantum, so has computing. Quantum computers have been shown to outperform classical computers when it comes to simulating
quantum mechanics as well as for
several other algorithms such as Shor's algorithm for factorization and Grover's algorithm for quantum search, making them an attractive area to research for solving computational finance problems.

Quantum continuous model 
Most quantum option pricing research typically focuses on the quantization of the classical Black–Scholes–Merton equation from the perspective of continuous equations like the Schrödinger equation. Haven builds on the work of Chen and others, but considers the market from the perspective of the Schrödinger equation. The key message in Haven's work is that the Black–Scholes–Merton equation is really a special case of the Schrödinger equation where markets are assumed to be efficient. The Schrödinger-based equation that Haven derives has a parameter ħ (not to be confused with the complex conjugate of h) that represents the amount of arbitrage that is present in the market resulting from a variety of sources including non-infinitely fast price changes, non-infinitely fast information dissemination and unequal wealth among traders. Haven argues that by setting this value appropriately, a more accurate option price can be derived, because in reality, markets are not truly efficient.

This is one of the reasons why it is possible that a quantum option pricing model could be more accurate than a classical one.  Baaquie has published many papers on quantum finance and even written a book that brings many of them together. Core to Baaquie's research and others like Matacz are Feynman's path integrals.

Baaquie applies path integrals to several exotic options and presents analytical results comparing his results to the results of Black–Scholes–Merton equation showing that they are very similar.  Piotrowski et al. take a different approach by changing the Black–Scholes–Merton assumption regarding the behavior of the stock underlying the option. Instead of assuming it follows a Wiener–Bachelier process, they assume that it follows an Ornstein–Uhlenbeck process. With this new assumption in place, they derive a quantum finance model as well as a European call option formula.

Other models such as Hull–White and Cox–Ingersoll–Ross have successfully used the same approach in the classical setting with interest rate derivatives. Khrennikov builds on the work of Haven and others and further bolsters the idea that the market efficiency assumption made by the Black–Scholes–Merton equation may not be appropriate. To support this idea, Khrennikov builds on a framework of contextual probabilities using agents as a way of overcoming criticism of applying quantum theory to finance. Accardi and Boukas again quantize the Black–Scholes–Merton equation, but in this case, they also consider the underlying stock to have both Brownian and Poisson processes.

Quantum binomial model 
Chen published a paper in 2001, where he presents a quantum binomial options pricing model or simply abbreviated as the quantum binomial model.  Metaphorically speaking, Chen's quantum binomial options pricing model (referred to
hereafter as the quantum binomial model) is to existing quantum finance models what the Cox–Ross–Rubinstein classical binomial options pricing model was to the Black–Scholes–Merton model: a discretized and simpler version of the same result. These simplifications make the respective theories not only easier to analyze but also easier to implement on a computer.

Multi-step quantum binomial model 
In the multi-step model the quantum pricing formula is:

which is the equivalent of the Cox–Ross–Rubinstein binomial options pricing model formula as follows:

This shows that assuming stocks behave according to Maxwell–Boltzmann classical statistics, the quantum binomial model does indeed collapse to the classical binomial model.

Quantum volatility is as follows as per Meyer:

Bose–Einstein assumption 
Maxwell–Boltzmann statistics can be replaced by the quantum Bose–Einstein statistics resulting in the following option price formula:

The Bose–Einstein equation will produce option prices that will differ from those produced by the Cox–Ross–Rubinstein option
pricing formula in certain circumstances.  This is because the stock is being treated like a quantum boson particle instead of a classical particle.

Quantum algorithm for the pricing of derivatives 
Rebentrost showed in 2018 that an algorithm exists for quantum computers capable of pricing financial derivatives with a square root advantage over classical methods. This development marks a shift from using quantum mechanics to gain insight into functional finance, to using quantum systems- quantum computers, to perform those calculations.

In 2020 Orrell proposed an option-pricing model based on a quantum walk which can run on a photonics device.

References

External links 
 Quantum Finance

Applied and interdisciplinary physics
Mathematical finance
Quantum mechanics
Schools of economic thought
Statistical mechanics
Interdisciplinary subfields of economics